Véronique Tilmont (born 16 May 1955) is a French gymnast. She competed at the 1972 Summer Olympics.

References

External links
 

1955 births
Living people
French female artistic gymnasts
Olympic gymnasts of France
Gymnasts at the 1972 Summer Olympics
Place of birth missing (living people)
20th-century French women